This is a list of mountains of the Swiss canton of Ticino. Ticino is a very mountainous canton and lies almost entirely within the Alps. It is also one of the nine cantons having summits above 3,000 metres. Topographically, the two most important summits of the canton are those of the Rheinwaldhorn (most elevated and isolated) and Monte Tamaro (most prominent).

This list only includes significant summits with a topographic prominence of at least . There are over 140 such summits in Ticino and they are found in all its 8 districts. All mountain heights and prominences on the list are from the largest-scale maps available.

List
{| class="wikitable sortable" style="text-align: center; background-color:#F9F9F9; font-size: 100%;"
|- bgcolor="#dddddd"
!Mountain
!Height (m) 
!Drop (m)
!Coordinates
!Range 
!District(s) 
!Firstascent
|-
|Rheinwaldhorn/Adula
|3402
|1337
|
|Lepontine Alps
|Blenio
|1789
|-
|Basòdino
|3272
|959
|
|Lepontine Alps
|Vallemaggia
|1863
|-
|Vogelberg
|3218
|303
|
|Lepontine Alps
|Blenio
|1864
|-
|Piz Medel
|3211
|952
|
|Lepontine Alps
|Blenio
|1865
|-
|Puntone dei Fraciòn
|3202
|157
|
|Lepontine Alps
|Blenio
|
|-
|Pizzo Rotondo
|3192
|752
|
|Lepontine Alps
|Leventina
|1869
|-
|Scopi
|3190
|792
|
|Lepontine Alps
|Blenio
|1782
|-
|Cima Rossa
|3161
|236
|
|Lepontine Alps
|Blenio
|
|-
|Piz Terri
|3149
|390
|
|Lepontine Alps
|Blenio
|1802
|-
|Pizzo Campo Tencia
|3072
|754
|
|Lepontine Alps
|Leventina/Vallemaggia
|1867
|-
|Chüebodenhorn
|3070
|316
|
|Lepontine Alps
|Leventina
|
|-
|Cima dei Cogn
|3063
|177
|
|Lepontine Alps
|Blenio
|
|-
|Pizzo Gallina
|3061
|378
|
|Lepontine Alps
|Leventina
|
|-
|Piz Blas
|3019
|312
|
|Lepontine Alps
|Leventina
|1871
|-
|Piz Rondadura
|3016
|266
|
|Lepontine Alps
|Leventina
|
|-
|Pizzo Centrale
|2999
|451
|
|Lepontine Alps
|Leventina
|
|-
|Grieshorn
|2969
|509
|
|Lepontine Alps
|Leventina
|
|-
|Pizzo Lucendro
|2963
|350
|
|Lepontine Alps
|Leventina
|1871
|-
|Marchhorn/Pta del Termine
|2962
|327
|
|Lepontine Alps
|Vallemaggia
|
|-
|Torent/Torrone Alto
|2952
|835
|
|Lepontine Alps
|Riviera
|1882
|-
|Pizzo del Ramulazz S
|2939
|324
|
|Lepontine Alps
|Blenio
|
|-
|Cristallina
|2912
|344
|
|Lepontine Alps
|Vallemaggia
|
|-
|Nufenenstock
|2866
|381
|
|Lepontine Alps
|Leventina
|
|-
|Poncione di Braga
|2864
|301
|
|Lepontine Alps
|Vallemaggia
|
|-
|Wandfluhhorn/Pizzo Biela
|2863
|452
|
|Lepontine Alps
|Vallemaggia
|
|-
|Cima di Gana Bianca
|2842
|410
|
|Lepontine Alps
|Blenio
|
|-
|Pizzo Castello
|2808
|385
|
|Lepontine Alps
|Vallemaggia
|
|-
|Corona di Redorta
|2804
|481
|
|Lepontine Alps
|Locarno/Vallemaggia
|
|-
|Pizzo Quadro
|2793
|470
|
|Lepontine Alps
|Vallemaggia
|
|-
|Pizzo Marumo
|2790
|435
|
|Lepontine Alps
|Blenio
|
|-
|Pizzo del Sole
|2773
|555
|
|Lepontine Alps
|Blenio/Leventina
|
|-
|Il Madone
|2768
|330
|
|Lepontine Alps
|Leventina/Vallemaggia
|
|-
|Pizzo Massari
|2760
|424
|
|Lepontine Alps
|Leventina/Vallemaggia
|
|-
|Madom Gröss
|2741
|630
|
|Lepontine Alps
|Leventina/Locarno
|
|-
|Schenadüi
|2738
|375
|
|Lepontine Alps
|Leventina
|
|-
|Monte Zucchero
|2735
|554
|
|Lepontine Alps
|Locarno/Vallemaggia
|
|-
|Pizzo di Claro
|2727
|361
|
|Lepontine Alps
|Riviera
|
|-
|Pizzo Cramalina
|2322
|297
|
|Lepontine Alps
|Ticino
|
|-
|Pizzo dell'Alpe Gelato
|2613
|357
|
|Lepontine Alps
|Vallemaggia
|
|-
|Cima Bianca
|2612
|309
|
|Lepontine Alps
|Blenio
|
|-
|Rosso di Ribia
|2547
|569
|
|Lepontine Alps
|Locarno/Vallemaggia
|
|-
|Cima di Bri
|2520
|313
|
|Lepontine Alps
|Leventina/Locarno
|
|-
|Cima di Pinadee
|2486
|455
|
|Lepontine Alps
|Blenio
|
|-
|Pizzo Erra
|2416
|300
|
|Lepontine Alps
|Blenio/Leventina
|
|-
|Poncione Piancascia
|2360
|325
|
|Lepontine Alps
|Locarno/Vallemaggia
|
|-
|Pizzo Bombögn
|2331
|268
|
|Lepontine Alps
|Vallemaggia
|
|-
|Camoghè
|2228
|283
|
|Lugano Prealps
|Bellinzona/Lugano
|
|-
|Sosto
|2221
|524
|
|Lepontine Alps
|Blenio
|
|-
|Gridone/Monte Limidario
|2188
|1218
|
|Lepontine Alps
|Locarno
|
|-
|Pizzo Ruscada
|2004
|330
|
|Lepontine Alps
|Locarno
|
|-
|Monte Tamaro
|1961
|1408
|
|Lugano Prealps
|Locarno/Lugano
|
|-
|Cima di Fojorina
|1810
|305
|
|Lugano Prealps
|Lugano
|
|-
|Monte Gambarogno
|1734
|339
|
|Lugano Prealps
|Locarno
|
|-
|Monte Generoso
|1701
|1321
|
|Lugano Prealps
|Lugano
|
|-
|Monte Salmone
|1560
|484
|
|Lepontine Alps
|Locarno/Vallemaggia
|
|-
|Monte Boglia
|1516
|342
|
|Lugano Prealps
|Lugano
|
|-
|Monte San Giorgio
|1097
|758
|
|Lugano Prealps
|Lugano/Mendrisio
|
|-
|Poncione d'Arzo
|1015
|345
|
|Lugano Prealps
|Mendrisio
|
|-
|Monte San Salvatore
|912
|602
|
|Lugano Prealps
|Lugano
|
|
|-
|MonteLema
|1621
|902
|
|Lugano Prealps
|Lugano

Notes

References

Ticino